Zhakyp Yesimuly Kozhamberdy (Jaqyp Esımūly Qojamberdı; born 26 February 1992) is a Kazakhstani footballer who plays as a midfielder for FC Taraz.

Club career
He made his debut for Taraz on 14 June 2013, starting in a 0–1 home defeat against Ordabasy and being substituted after 79 minutes for Adilet Kudaybergen. Fifteen days later, he came on as a 75th-minute substitute for Sherkhan Bauyrzhan and scored both of the team's goals in a 2–1 home win over Shakhter Karagandy. These were his only league goals in 8 appearances that season. On 10 November, he started in the Kazakhstan Cup final against Shakhter at the Astana Arena, a 0–1 defeat in which he was replaced by Emanuel Odita with three minutes remaining.

On 8 July 2015, Kozhamberdy moved to FC Astana on a six-month contract, with the option of an extension at the end of it.

International career
He made his debut for the Kazakhstan national football team on 18 February 2015, replacing Azat Nurgaliev for the last 16 minutes of a 1–0 friendly win over Moldova in Aksu.

References

Living people
1992 births
Association football midfielders
Kazakhstani footballers
Kazakhstan international footballers
Kazakhstan Premier League players
FC Taraz players
FC Astana players
FC Okzhetpes players
FC Zhetysu players
FC Kyran players
People from Taraz